Pyotr Popov (born 4 September 1985) is a Russian luger who has competed since 2002. A natural track luger, he won the silver medal in the men's doubles event at the 2007 FIL World Luge Natural Track Championships in Grande Prairie, Alberta, Canada.

Popov also won two bronzes in the men's doubles event at the FIL European Luge Natural Track Championships, earning them in 2008 and 2010.

References
FIL-Luge profile
Natural track World Championships results: 1979-2007

External links

 

1985 births
Living people
Russian male lugers